Astrogenes insignita is a species of moth in the family Tineidae. It was described by Alfred Philpott in 1930. This species is endemic to New Zealand.

References

Moths described in 1930
Tineidae
Moths of New Zealand
Endemic fauna of New Zealand
Endemic moths of New Zealand